Move Me is the nineteenth studio album by the Scottish hard rock band Nazareth, released in 1994.

The sonic retooling of Nazareth continued with Billy Rankin standing his ground, taking on more songwriting responsibilities. Of the eleven tracks on the Move Me, eight are credited solely to Rankin, who also received co-writing credits on three others. Returning to CAS Studios in Shuren, Germany, Nazareth teamed up with Tony Taverner to handle the production.

Track listing

Bonus Tracks (The Unplugged Versions)

1997 Castle Communications bonus tracks

2002 30th Anniversary bonus tracks

2011 Salvo and 2014 vinyl bonus track 

The 2011 remastered CD release of Move Me was paired with Boogaloo

Personnel

Band members 
 Dan McCafferty - vocals
 Billy Rankin - guitars
 Pete Agnew - bass guitar
 Darrell Sweet - drums
 Produced by Tony Taverner and Nazareth

Chart performance

References 

Nazareth (band) albums
1994 albums
Polydor Records albums